The Elan Award is presented annually to an established choreographer. The awards ceremony, which has been often held at the Fashion Institute of Technology, also serves as an opportunity for up-and-coming choreographers to present original work.

Recipients 
 2000: Graciela Daniele
 2001: Jerry Mitchell
 2002: Ann Reinking
 2003: Rob Marshall
 2004: Lar Lubovitch
 2005: Susan Stroman

References 

Awards established in 2000
Choreography awards